A list of American films released in 1975.

One Flew Over the Cuckoo's Nest won the Academy Award for Best Picture. The highest-grossing film of 1975 was Jaws.



A–B

C–G

H–M

N–S

T–Z

See also
 1975 in the United States

External links

 1975 films at the Internet Movie Database
 List of 1975 box office number-one films in the United States

1975
Films
Lists of 1975 films by country or language